Pacific Coffee (formerly known as Pacific Coffee Company; abbv. "PCC") is a coffee house chain from Hong Kong, with outlets in China, Singapore and Malaysia. The group is owned by computer distributor Chevalier Pacific, formerly Chevalier iTech. It acquired the chain from founder Thomas Neir for HK$205 million in 2005.

In June 2010, China Resources Enterprise (CRE) and Chevalier forged a partnership to further expand the Pacific Coffee business in the Chinese Mainland with CRE being a major shareholder and to have Pacific Coffee developed under the umbrella of CRE's Retail Business Unit.

Apart from its stores, PCC also sells own-brand coffee beans and Jura brand coffee machines to distributors and corporate clients, such as banks, airline companies, clubs and hotels.  Its coffee beans are sold in Hong Kong, Macau and Singapore.

Hong Kong
PCC was started by Thomas Neir of Seattle, who came to Hong Kong in 1992. Neir saw a lack of European-style coffee houses in his adopted city. The first PCC outlet opened in 1993 at the Bank of America Tower in Hong Kong's Central district.
In 2005, the PCC at The Peak was voted "Asia's top favourite wireless hotspot" in a survey of 1,996 people in 20 countries by Intel.

International branches

PCC has 120 branches in Hong Kong, as well as branches in Beijing, Shanghai, Macau, Foshan, Shenzhen, Guangzhou, Hangzhou, Nanjing, Shenyang, Suzhou, Xi'an, Zhuhai, Singapore, Cyprus and Malaysia.

See also

 Starbucks
 McCafé
 List of coffeehouse chains

References

External links
 A Hong Kong public listed company announcement regarding to the Pacific Coffee Company.

Coffeehouses and cafés in China
Fast-food chains of Hong Kong
Fast-food chains of China
Catering and food service companies of Hong Kong
Hong Kong brands
Drink companies of Hong Kong
Restaurants established in 1993